The Marriage and Civil Partnership (Minimum Age) Act 2022 is a Private Members Bill advocated for by former Conservative Home Secretary Sajid Javid. The bill is sponsored by fellow Conservative MP Pauline Latham.

The Act received royal assent on 28 April 2022.

Background 
The proposed bill will criminalise child marriage, which is prevalent in the UK particularly in British Asian communities. The age of marriage will be raised from 16 to 18. Data from The Observer shows that 2,377 contacts were made about child marriage to the UK's national forced marriage helpline.

The law is supported by children's charities Girls Not Brides and Barnardo's.

The bill is co-sponsored by Labour MP and Chair of the International Development Select Committee Sarah Champion.

Second reading of the Bill in the House of Commons took place on 19 November 2021 when it received Government and Opposition support.

References 

Proposed laws of the United Kingdom
Child marriage
Marriage law in the United Kingdom
Children's rights in the United Kingdom
2021 in British politics